Rhiniidae is a family of flies in the order Diptera, and formerly included in the Calliphoridae. There are around 30 genera and 370 described species in Rhiniidae.>

Genera
These genera belong to the family Rhiniidae:

Albaredaya Peris, 1956
Alikangiella Villeneuve, 1927
Arrhinidia Brauer & Bergenstamm, 1892
Borbororhinia Townsend, 1917
Cameranda Lehrer, 2007
Chlororhinia Townsend, 1917
Cosmina Robineau-Desvoidy, 1830
Ethioporhina Lehrer, 2007
Eurhyncomyia Malloch, 1926
Fainia Zumpt, 1958
Idiella Brauer & Bergenstamm, 1889
Idiellopsis Townsend, 1917
Isomyia Walker, 1926
Malayomyza Malloch, 1928
Metallea Wulp, 1880
Metalliopsis Townsend, 1917
Pararhynchomyia Becker, 1910
Perisiella Zumpt, 1958
Pseudorhyncomyia Peris, 1952
Rhinia Robineau-Desvoidy, 1830
Rhyncomya Robineau-Desvoidy, 1830
Stegosoma Loew, 1863
Stomorhina Rondani, 1861
Strongyloneura Bigot, 1886
Sumatria Malloch, 1926
Thoracites Brauer & Bergenstamm, 1891
Trichoberia Townsend, 1933
Vanemdenia Peris, 1951
Villeneuviella Austen, 1914
Zumba Peris, 1951

References

 
Brachycera families